Dominic Gerald Lowery (born May 27, 1956) is a former American football placekicker. In his career he played for the New England Patriots, Kansas City Chiefs, and New York Jets. He played in college at Dartmouth College. Lowery was selected to the Pro Bowl three times and when he retired was ranked first in field goal percentage and also had the most field goals in NFL history.  he was 16th on the National Football League's list of all-time scoring leaders, and is the Chiefs' all-time leading scorer, with 1,466 points in his 14 seasons with the club.

Lowery grew up in Washington, D.C. and attended St. Albans School where he was a star football player.

He attended Dartmouth College. He has an M.P.A from Harvard's Kennedy School of Government, the first pro athlete to graduate from there.

In 2009 Lowery was inducted into the Kansas City Chiefs Hall of Fame.

Until 2022, Lowery held the Chiefs franchise record for longest field goal of 58 yards, which he accomplished twice, against the Washington Redskins on September 18, 1983 and against the Oakland Raiders on September 12, 1985. The record was tied twice in 2020 by Harrison Butker, who kicked two 58 yard field goals in the same game, before Butker broke the record with a 62 yard kick.

Career regular season statistics
Career high/best bolded

References

External links

Nick Lowery's official foundation web site
Lowery's Media and speaking website
nfl.com player profile
Chiefs Hall of Fame page for Nick Lowery

1956 births
Living people
Sportspeople from Munich
German players of American football
St. Albans School (Washington, D.C.) alumni
Players of American football from Washington, D.C.
Harvard Kennedy School alumni
American football placekickers
Dartmouth Big Green football players
New England Patriots players
Kansas City Chiefs players
New York Jets players
American Conference Pro Bowl players